The Airlines Reporting Corporation (ARC) is a company that provides ticket transaction settlement services between airlines and travel agencies (both traditional and online) and the travel management companies that sell their products in the United States. ARC, which is owned by nine major airlines, also offers its transactional data within various industries, including financial. In 2019, ARC processed more than $97.4 billion worth of transactions for its customers.

History

ARC was established on September 17, 1984, as a privately held company following airline deregulation in the United States. The corporation began operations on January 1, 1985, in Washington, D.C., settling financial ticket transactions between airlines and travel agencies.  ARC is the successor to the Air Traffic Conference of America, an operating division of Airlines for America, formerly known as the Air Transport Association of America, Inc. (ATA).

ARC's primary function is to support the travel industry by providing transaction settlement between travel suppliers and resellers. The corporation also accredits travel agencies in the United States to sell airline tickets, and provides data information services and analysis based on archived aggregated data.

Shareholders and Board Member Companies

Shareholders:
 Air Canada
 Alaska Airlines
 American Airlines
 Delta Air Lines
 Hawaiian Airlines
 JetBlue Airways
 Southwest Airlines
 United Airlines

Board Members:
 ARC – Bonnie Reitz (Chair)
 ARC – Lauri Reishus (President, CEO)
 Air Canada – Lisa Pierce
 Air France – Isabel Monteiro
 Alaska Airlines, Inc. – Kevin Thiel
 American Airlines – Angie Owens
 Delta Air Lines – Derek Adair
 Hawaiian Airlines, Inc. – Sayle Hirashima 
 JetBlue Airways – Jonathan Weiner
 Lufthansa Global Business Services – Michael Klein
 Southwest Airlines – Mark Erickson
 United Airlines – Glenn Hollister
 Chair of Audit Committee – Angie Owens

References

External links
 Official Website
 Working with MIDT, ARC and BSP Data, by Eric Ford at Oliver Wyman, 2008

Airline tickets
Transport law